Eupithecia purpurissata is a moth in the family Geometridae first described by John Arthur Grossbeck in 1908. It is found in the US state of California.

The forewings are deep purplish brown. The hindwings are deep smoky with a faint purplish tinge. Adults have been recorded on wing from February to July.

Subspecies
Eupithecia purpurissata purpurissata (northern and central California)
Eupithecia purpurissata valariata Pearsall, 1910 (southern California)

References

purpurissata
Endemic fauna of California
Moths of North America
Moths described in 1908
Fauna without expected TNC conservation status